JBT EP, also known as the Pickapart EP is a 4 track EP from Australian jam band the John Butler Trio. "Pickapart", "Don't Understand" and "Earthbound Child" would then make it onto the U.S. version of their LP Three, but none of the tracks were re-used in the Australian release of that album.

The album art was designed by Insomnia Design, and features the same graphic art of a tree that is on the Trio's independent record label Jarrah Records, run by their manager Phil Stevens.

Track listing
All tracks written by John Butler

 "Pickapart" – 2:59  
 "Don't Understand" – 4:30  
 "Earthbound Child" – 3:50  
 "Trees" – 4:14

Performers
 John Butler - amplified/acoustic 11 string guitar
 Gavin Shoesmith - electric & double bass
 Jason McGann - drums, percussion

John Butler Trio albums
2000 EPs
Jam bands